"Hang On to Your Heart" is a song written by J.P. Pennington and Sonny LeMaire, and recorded by American country music group Exile. It was released in July 1985 as the first single and title track from the album Hang On to Your Heart. The song was Exile's sixth number one country hit. The single went to number one for one week and spent a total of fifteen weeks on the country chart.

Chart performance

References

1985 singles
Exile (American band) songs
Songs written by J.P. Pennington
Song recordings produced by Buddy Killen
Epic Records singles
1985 songs
Songs written by Sonny LeMaire